DYFJ (99.9 FM) is a relay station of RJFM Manila, owned and operated by Rajah Broadcasting Network through its licensee Free Air Broadcasting Network, Inc. The station's transmitter is located at Brgy., Pahanocoy, Bacolod.

References

External links
RJFM FB Page

Radio stations in Bacolod
Radio stations established in 1985